Samuel L. Jackson (born 1948) is an American actor and film producer also credited as Samuel Jackson.

Samuel Jackson or Sam Jackson may also refer to:

Arts and entertainment
 Samuel Jackson (artist) (1784–1869), English artist
 Samuel Phillips Jackson (1830–1904), English artist; son of the above
 Samuel P. Jackson (1818–1885), American organist and composer
 Sam Peter Jackson (born 1978), playwright and actor
 Sam Jackson (actor) (born 1993), English actor

Politics and law
 Samuel Jackson (lawyer) (1831–1913), New Zealand attorney and solicitor
 Samuel Jacob Jackson (1848–1942), Manitoba politician
 Samuel D. Jackson (1895–1951), U.S. Senator from Indiana

Sports
 Sam Jackson (second baseman) (1849–1930), American baseball player
 Samuel Jackson (cricketer) (1859–1941), English cricketer
 Sam Jackson (catcher), American baseball player of the 1880s
 Sam Jackson (pitcher), American baseball player of the 1920s
 Sam Jackson (first baseman), American baseball player of the 1940s
 Sam Jackson (footballer)

Others
 Samuel Jackson (Royal Navy officer) (1775–1845), British naval officer
 Samuel Cram Jackson (1830–1879), American Congregational minister
 Samuel Macauley Jackson (1851–1912), American clergyman, editor and author
 Sam Jackson (publisher) (1860–1924), American newspaper publisher
 Samuel Jackson Barnett (1873–1956), American physicist

See also
 Samuel Jackson Jr. House, a historic house in Newton, Massachusetts
 Sammy Jackson (1937–1995), American actor
 Samuel Johnson (disambiguation)